Andrew Stuart Luster (born December 15, 1963) is heir to the Max Factor cosmetics fortune and a convicted sex offender. He is the great-grandson of cosmetics giant Max Factor Sr. In 2003 he was convicted of multiple sexual assaults using the date-rape drug GHB.

Early life
Andrew Luster is the son of Henry Luster, a psychiatrist, and Elizabeth Luster (née Shore). His mother was the adopted daughter of Max Factor, Sr.'s daughter Freda. He grew up in Malibu, California, and attended Windward School in Los Angeles.

After graduating, Luster moved to Mussel Shoals, California, living on a $1 million trust fund and living in a $600,000 cottage on the beach. According to the Los Angeles Times, this move and Luster's "freewheeling lifestyle" weakened his "already tenuous" ties to the Factor family, which was heavily involved in the arts and philanthropy.

Sexual assault charges and conviction
In 2000, Luster was arrested when a student at a local college told police that she had been raped at Luster's home. Upon investigation, police charged Luster with drugging three women with the date-rape drug GHB, sexually assaulting them, and video-taping the assaults, having found videotapes of the assaults when they searched his home. After paying $1 million bail, Luster failed to appear in court to defend himself against the charges in January 2003. Luster was convicted in absentia and sentenced to 124 years in prison. 

Luster's legal case earned major attention due to his family's wealth, and in January 2003 the FBI issued a warrant for Unlawful Flight to Avoid Prosecution. In June 2003, he was captured by American bounty hunter Duane "Dog" Chapman in Puerto Vallarta, Mexico. Both Luster and Chapman were subsequently arrested by Mexican police. Luster was handed over to American authorities. Chapman's felony kidnapping charge was reduced to a misdemeanor, and his lawyer advised him to flee Mexico when he was released on bail. Chapman later wrote that he believed his actions in Mexico were legal due to working closely with a Mexican police officer while in that nation, but the American judge in Luster's case refused to grant Chapman any reward or bond. Chapman also explained that during his pursuit of Luster, he consulted with "a forensic expert who specialized in sex crimes" who believed Luster's preference for raping unconscious, passive victims indicated a necrophile tendency that might lead to murder.

The California Court of Appeal refused Luster's appeal, citing that Luster had been a fugitive. Longstanding precedent holds that fugitives flout the court's authority, and thus forfeit their right to appeal. The California Supreme Court and the United States Supreme Court later refused to overturn this ruling.

Prison sentence and civil suits
Luster is currently incarcerated at Valley State Prison in Chowchilla, California. Under California law, since his crimes harmed other persons, he is required to serve at least 85% of his sentence before becoming eligible for release with time off with good behavior. Had his original sentence stood, Luster would not have even been considered for release until he served 105 years—effectively a life sentence.

In late 2009, Luster filed a petition for habeas corpus as the final possibility of having his case reviewed by another court on appeal. Luster was represented in that suit by Jay Leiderman and J. David Nick. The habeas corpus petition was granted in April 2012. On March 11, 2013, the Ventura County Superior Court vacated Luster's 124-year sentence but not his conviction, based on the trial judge's failure to state specific reasons for imposing consecutive sentences, and ordered a new sentencing hearing April 4, 2013.

On April 16, 2013, Ventura County Superior Court Judge Kathryne Stoltz reduced Luster's sentence to 50 years—48 years for the rapes and two years for the drug-related charges. Luster's lawyers have indicated there will be an appeal.

In 2016, opponents of California Proposition 57 released a brochure that stated that Luster could be released early due to the lack of clarity for what defines "violent crimes." In response to this brochure, California Governor Jerry Brown told Fresno County sheriff Margaret Mims that Luster was originally sentenced to 100 years in prison and was a registered sex offender, "and on both accounts would not be getting out." Brown's administration later clarified that since Luster would have to register as a sex offender, he would not be eligible for parole even if Proposition 57 passed.

Two of the victims won civil lawsuits against Luster, who was ordered to pay a total of $40 million. Luster subsequently sold most of his property and declared bankruptcy.

Media portrayals 
After Luster fled the United States, a movie based on his crimes, A Date with Darkness: The Trial and Capture of Andrew Luster was produced with the intention of aiding in his capture by ending with a photo of him, and a request for witnesses to his whereabouts to notify authorities. Because the film was in production when Luster was captured, the ending was re-written to incorporate his capture.

On August 28, 2009, the true crime TV Series Dominick Dunne's Power, Privilege, and Justice aired an episode on the case in Season 3, Episode 4, "Evil Deeds".

On August 31, 2017, Investigation Discovery aired the first episode of Guilty Rich, which recounted the story of Andrew Luster's crimes, arrest, flight, and ultimate conviction and incarceration.

References

External links
Luster crimelibrary.com

1963 births
21st-century American criminals
American people convicted of rape
American people convicted of sodomy
American surfers
Criminals from Nevada
Fugitives
Living people
People convicted in absentia
People extradited from Mexico to the United States
People from the Las Vegas Valley
Prisoners and detainees of California
Wealth in the United States